Run for the Sun is a 1956 Technicolor thriller adventure film released by United Artists, the third film to officially be based on Richard Connell's classic 1924 suspense story, "The Most Dangerous Game", after both RKO's The Most Dangerous Game (1932), and their remake, A Game of Death (1945).  This version stars Richard Widmark, Trevor Howard, and Jane Greer, and was directed by Ray Boulting from a script written by Boulting and Dudley Nichols. Connell was credited for his short story.

In this loose adaptation, the expatriate Russian general of the original story is transformed into a British traitor hiding in the Mexican jungle with a fellow Nazi war criminal played by Peter van Eyck. Their prey are Widmark, portraying a Hemingway-like but reclusive novelist, and Greer, playing a magazine journalist who has tracked down the novelist's whereabouts. In this version, the Nazis are hunting them not for sport, but to prevent them revealing their whereabouts.

Plot
Katie Connors (Jane Greer), on the editorial staff of Sight magazine, journeys to San Marcos, a remote Mexican fishing village, seeking novelist and adventurer Mike Latimer (Richard Widmark), who has abandoned writing "at the peak of his fame" and dropped from sight. She soon learns that he is indeed there, indulging in drinking, fishing, hunting, and flying his aircraft. Katie contrives to meet him, pretending not to know his identity, but Latimer easily sees through her clumsy denials and is immediately attracted to her. Over the next several days they enjoy each other's company, but Katie may be falling in love with him and conceals the real reason she is there.

After Latimer explains that his wife was the muse behind his literary success, and that he quit writing because she left him to be with his best friend, Katie decides to go back to New York. Latimer offers to fly her to Mexico City and asks Katie to write down her address to keep in touch. During the flight, the magnetized notebook in Katie's purse affects the aircraft's magnetic compass and they find themselves lost over jungle. The aircraft runs out of fuel and Latimer crash-lands in a small clearing. Knocked unconscious, he wakes up to find himself in a bed in the main house of a hacienda.

Katie introduces him to their rescuers, an Englishman named Browne (Trevor Howard) and the Dutch archaeologist Dr. van Anders (Peter van Eyck), who live on the estate with Jan (Carlos Henning) a third European. Latimer feels that he once met the cordial Browne, a big game hunter himself, but cannot place it. The more suspicious and secretive Anders asks about a rifle bullet that Latimer always carries with him, which Latimer relates is a souvenir and good luck charm from the D-Day invasion, a time when his courage failed him. Almost immediately the couple senses that things are not as they appear.

Browne keeps a pack of savage dogs to prowl the estate and control the local populace; when Latimer goes to examine the condition of his aircraft, it has disappeared; Browne claims he has no contact to the outside world and Katie doubts that Anders is really an archaeologist. However friction develops between them when a newscast on the radio announcing their disappearance reveals Katie's identity and original purpose. Katie tries to persuade Latimer that she no longer intends to write the story but he rebuffs her.

That night, Latimer finds a storeroom containing military gear with Nazi markings, items from his missing aircraft supposedly stolen  by the local Indians, and a cabinet of hunting rifles. The barking of the prowling dogs awakens Browne and Anders, and Latimer overhears them talking in German. He tells Katie what he found and warns her that they need to work together to try to escape. They discover that Browne has been concealing from them, his own "flyable" aircraft.

Latimer finally realizes it is Browne's voice he recognizes, and that he is an infamous turncoat who during the war broadcast Nazi propaganda from Berlin to Britain after he had married a German girl. The Englishman admits the truth and adds that his wife was Anders' sister, killed in a British air raid. Latimer tries to bargain for Katie's release but to no avail. Latimer realizes Anders is a German war criminal who massacred an entire village and intends to kill them. He and Katie try to steal the aircraft, but when Jan shoots at them, they flee into the jungle.

Browne, leading Anders, Jan and the dogs, follows their trail, failing to catch them the first day when a group of wild pigs attack the dogs. The next day, the wilderness-wise Latimer rigs a crude booby trap that kills Jan. With Katie nearing exhaustion, Latimer contrives to double back, and when Browne and Anders find Jan's dead body, they realize that the aircraft has been left unguarded. Stopping for the night, Latimer starts to cover Katie with his jacket and finds that she wrote down the office address of Sight magazine as her own, proving that she had been truthful about her feelings.

They reach the hacienda just ahead of their pursuers and barricade themselves in the chapel. Anders pretends to negotiate with Latimer and shoots through the door. Latimer ridicules him and when Anders goes to bring workers to break down the door, he is forced to lock up the dogs to get their cooperation. Browne fears the fanatical Nazi and offers to shoot Anders if Latimer flies him to South America. Latimer refuses and uses the bullet hole in the door as a makeshift gun barrel for his lucky bullet, striking the primer with a chisel and fatally shooting Browne. Latimer and Katie take off in Browne's aircraft, killing Anders with the propeller when he tries to block their path. They manage to safely escape.

Cast

Richard Widmark as Michael Latimer
Trevor Howard as Browne
Jane Greer as Katie Connors
Peter van Eyck as Dr. Van Anders / Colonel Von Andre
 Juan García as Fernandez
 José Antonio Carbajal as Paco
 José Chávez as Pedro (as José Chávez Trowe)
 Guillermo Calles as Paco
 Margarito Luna as Gran-Hotel Proprietor
 Guillermo Bravo Sosa as Gran-Hotel Waiter
 Enedina Díaz de León as Paco's Wife
 Carlos Henning as Jan

Production
Run for the Sun was one of four films produced for United Artists release by a company owned by actress Jane Russell and her then husband, former NFL star Bob Waterfield. Originally Russell and Robert Mitchum were announced as stars. Then Eva Marie Saint was going to play the female lead.

Robert Wilder wrote the original script for Run for the Sun and Dudley Nichols was brought in to work on it.

Roy Boulting was signed to direct Run for the Sun in August 1955. The original stars were to be Richard Widmark and Leo Genn. Jane Greer later joined the cast.

Genn was meant to play the head villain in Run for the Sun, and he had script approval at a rate of $3,500 a week plus expenses. The script was rewritten and Genn did not like the result when he arrived in Mexico to start filming. He pulled out; Trevor Howard was cast instead. Genn later sued Waterfield, who eventually had to pay Genn his complete salary.

The jungle sequences in Run for the Sun were shot about 50 miles from Acapulco, Mexico. The location used for Browne and Van Anders' base was a vast, ruined, 16th century hacienda and sugar plantation/refinery built by Hernán Cortés at Atlacomulco, southeast of Cuernavaca. In the 1980s, the principal house and several other buildings were restored and turned into a hotel. The interior and patio of the house used in the film, as well as the interior of the small hotel where Katie Connors and Mike Latimer meet, were sets built at Estudios Churubusco in Mexico City. The house interior was reputed to be the largest set yet built in a Mexican studio.

Reception
Film reviewer Leslie Halliwell in Leslie Halliwell's Film Guide (1989), noted that Run for the Sun was a "... tame remake of 'The Most Dangerous Game' with Count Zaroff replaced by Lord Haw-Haw; sluggish plot development mars the action."

Film reviewer Adrian Turner in the Time Out Film Guide (2004), said that Run for the Sun: "... never really gets to grip with the grotesquerie of the original story, though Howard as a dead ringer for Lord Haw-Haw, is excellent."

References

Notes

Citations

Bibliography

 Halliwell, Leslie. Leslie Halliwell's Film Guide. New York: Harper & Roe, 1989. .
 Maltin, Leonard. Leonard Maltin's Movie Encyclopedia. New York: Penguin Books, 1994. .
 Turner, Adrian. "Review: 'Run for the Sun'. in Pym, John, ed. Time Out Film Guide. London: Time Out Guides Limited, 2004. .

External links

 
 
 

1956 films
1956 adventure films
1950s crime films
American adventure films
American chase films
Films based on short fiction
Films directed by Roy Boulting
Films about hunters
Films set in Mexico
Films shot in Mexico
United Artists films
Films with screenplays by Dudley Nichols
Films about death games
1950s English-language films
1950s American films